Hobbs Peak is a prominent peak,  high, on the divide between Hobbs Glacier and Blue Glacier in Victoria Land, Antarctica. It is the highest point on the east–west section of this dividing ridge. The peak was climbed by members of the Victoria University of Wellington Antarctic Expedition (1960–61), who gave it this name from its nearness to Hobbs Glacier.

References

Mountains of Victoria Land
Scott Coast